"Yalla Habibi" (Arabic, 'Let's go, my dear') is a 2009 single by Karl Wolf featuring Rime and Kaz Money released in Canada as a follow up single to the successful "Carrera". The song is the first single taken from Karl 2009 album Nightlife and is track #1 in the album. It entered the Canadian Hot 100 on the chart dated 18 October 2009 and peaked at #24 on the chart dated 19 December 2009. Yalla Habibi was produced by I-Notchz Productions and written by Lukay "Hit-mayka" at the Documedia Studio.

Music video
The official video, is produced by Music Media Factory Inc  and by Lone Wolf Entertainment Inc., a production company owned by Karl Wolf. It was shot in Dubai and Ajman, in the United Arab Emirates, with Karl Wolf as director, Dominic Lachance as Co-Director and Editor, Ahmed Kardous as D.O.P and Yasir Alyasiri as producer.

Chart

References

2009 singles
Karl Wolf songs
2009 songs